Maria Yuryevna Polyakova (born 8 May 1997) is a Russian diver. She is a European Games and European champion. Polyakova also competed in NCAA diving for the UCLA Bruins, becoming UCLA’s first national champion in women’s diving, and graduating as the university’s record holder in both the 1 and 3 metres. She was named Pac-12 Diver of the Year in 2017 and 2019.

Polyakova has qualified for the 2020 Summer Olympics.

Personal life
Maria was born on 8 May 1997. She was a student-athlete majoring in  linguistics at the University of California, Los Angeles, and graduated in 2019.

References

Russian female divers
1997 births
Living people
Place of birth missing (living people)
Divers at the 2015 European Games
European Games medalists in diving
European Games gold medalists for Russia
European Games silver medalists for Russia
Universiade medalists in diving
Universiade bronze medalists for Russia
Divers at the 2020 Summer Olympics
Olympic divers of Russia]